Caister-on-Sea, also known colloquially as Caister, is a large village and seaside resort in Norfolk, England. It is close to the large town of Great Yarmouth.  At the 2001 census it had a population of 8,756 and 3,970 households, the population increasing to 8,901 at the 2011 Census.

It used to be served by Caister-on-Sea railway station. Following its closure in 1959, Great Yarmouth railway station,  to the south, became the nearest station.

History

Caister's history dates back to Roman times. In around AD 200 a fort was built here as a base for a unit of the Roman army and navy. However its role as a fort appears to have been reduced following the construction of the Saxon Shore fort at Burgh Castle on the southern side of the estuary in the latter part of the 3rd century.
The name 'Caister' derives from the Anglo-Saxon word 'ceaster' meaning 'Roman fort'

In the 1950s, a building near the south gate at Caister was excavated in advance of a housing development. These buildings do not appear to be military as they include a hypocaust and painted wall plaster as well as female jewellery, and it has been suggested that this building may have been an officer's house, or possibly a ‘seamen's hostel’ which may be a polite name for a brothel. The site appears to have been abandoned in the 5th century, but 150 Saxon burials have been found to the south of the enclosure. The remains excavated in the 1950s are now managed by English Heritage and are open free of charge to the public as Caister Roman Site.

There has been an offshore lifeboat in the area since 1791. It was used by a beach company to salvage ships wrecked on the sand banks. Between 1856 and 1969 lifeboats were operated by the RNLI. In the 1901 Caister lifeboat disaster, nine crew were lost while attempting a rescue during heavy seas. At the time it was said, "If they had to keep at it 'til now, they would have sailed about until daylight to help her. Going back is against the rules when we see distress signals like that". A monument to the men lost in the disaster bearing the inscription "Caister men never turn back" stands in the village cemetery, unveiled in 1903 and was listed Grade II by Historic England in 2020. A pub called the "Never Turn Back" is named after the incident.

Today, Caister is also host to a National Coastwatch Institution (NCI) Station.

21st century
There is a Haven caravan and holiday park near the coast. The oldest holiday camp in the UK, it began as the "Caister Socialist Camp" in 1906. In the 1950s and early 1960s, it used to be on both sides of the road. Opposite the beach was a dining room, paper shop, sports facilities and tourist chalets. These facilities were sold to a property developer who turned it into housing in the 1970s. In the 1980s a brand new holiday camp was opened, under the ownership of Ladbrokes, which was later sold to Warners in the 1990s.

Caister’s village football team, Caister F.C., currently play at the King George V playing field.

War Memorial

References

http://kepn.nottingham.ac.uk/map/place/Norfolk/Caister%20next%20Yarmouth

External links
 Great Yarmouth - the Golden Mile

 
Villages in Norfolk
Populated coastal places in Norfolk
Seaside resorts in England
Beaches of Norfolk
Civil parishes in Norfolk
Borough of Great Yarmouth